Anatoma philippinica is a species of a minute sea snail, a marine gastropod mollusk in the family Anatomidae.

Description
The shell grows to a height of 0.9 mm

Distribution
This marine species occurs off the Philippines.

References

External links

Anatomidae
Gastropods described in 1998